Kenneth Paul Venturi (May 15, 1931May 17, 2013) was an American professional golfer and golf broadcaster. In a career shortened by injuries, he won 14 events on the PGA Tour including a major, the U.S. Open in 1964. Shortly before his death in 2013, Venturi was inducted into the World Golf Hall of Fame.

Early years and amateur career
Born in San Francisco, California, Venturi learned to play golf at an early age, and developed his game at Harding Park Golf Course and other public courses in the Bay Area. He attended Lincoln High School and was the San Francisco high school golf champion in 1948 and 1949. Venturi also attended San José State University, where he was a member of the Spartan men's golf team from 1951 through 1953.

In the early 1950s, he was a pupil of Byron Nelson, and was also influenced by playing partner Ben Hogan. Venturi won the California State Amateur Championship in 1951 and 1956, serving in the U.S. Army in Korea and Europe in the interim.

Venturi first gained national attention at age 24; while still an amateur, he finished second in the Masters in 1956, one shot behind Jack Burke Jr., Venturi led after each of the first three rounds in an attempt to become the first-ever amateur to win the Masters, but shot a final round 80 and relinquished a four-shot lead. Through 2022, no amateur has won the Masters.

Professional career
Venturi turned pro at the end of 1956 and was a regular winner during his early years on the PGA Tour. He again came close to winning the Masters in 1958 and 1960, but was edged out both times by Arnold Palmer. On January 24, 1960, Venturi won the Bing Crosby National Pro-Am on the 1960 PGA Tour.

After suffering minor injuries in an automobile accident in 1961, Venturi's swing, and thus his career, began to slide. This slump lasted until 1964 when, for no reason even Venturi could fathom, he began playing well again. After a couple of high finishes, Venturi reached the pinnacle of his comeback by winning the U.S. Open in 1964 at Congressional Country Club, after nearly collapsing in the near- heat and humidity of the 36-hole final day. (The format was changed the next year in 1965.) Venturi was the first player to win the U.S. Open after conquering a sectional qualifier.

Venturi won again in July and August, tied for fifth in the PGA Championship, and received that year's Sports Illustrated magazine's "Sportsman of the Year" award and PGA Player of the Year award. He played on the Ryder Cup team in 1965, and received the 1998 Old Tom Morris Award from the Golf Course Superintendents Association of America, GCSAA's highest honor.

After 1964, Venturi's career again took a blow when he was diagnosed with carpal tunnel syndrome in both wrists. After missing the cut at the Masters by nine strokes, he received treatment at the Mayo Clinic in May. Defending his title at the U.S. Open in June, Venturi continued to have difficulty with his hands and entered the championship with plans to have surgery the following week. He missed the cut by ten strokes, had the surgery on both wrists, and was sidelined until the Ryder Cup in October in England. Venturi's condition improved and he won a tour event in January 1966 at the very familiar Harding Park in his hometown, but he soon relapsed; after additional surgeries, he could not regain his form.

Broadcasting career
After retiring from the Tour in 1967 with a total of 14 career wins, Venturi spent the next 35 years working as a color commentator and lead analyst for CBS Sports – the longest lead analyst stint in sports broadcasting history, made remarkable by the fact that he had a stutter, which was less manageable early in life. He retired from broadcasting at age 71 in June 2002, succeeded as CBS' lead analyst by Lanny Wadkins, then Nick Faldo in 2007.

Other ventures

Acting
Venturi appeared in the 1996 film Tin Cup, portraying himself as a commentator at the U.S. Open, held at a fictional course in North Carolina. In one scene, Venturi is shown voicing his opinion that the film's protagonist, Roy McAvoy (Kevin Costner), should lay up on a long par-5 rather than try to reach the green in two shots. McAvoy, who decided to go for it, is then shown saying, "This is for Venturi up in the booth thinking I should lay up." His caddy, played by Cheech Marin, sarcastically responds, "Yeah, what does he know? He only won this tournament before you were born."

Venturi described the actor and singer Frank Sinatra as his best friend and former roommate.

Course design and instruction
In 1990, Venturi redesigned and renovated the Eagle Creek Golf & Country Club course near Naples, Florida. He also lent his name to a series of instructional schools.

Honors
In 2004, after some controversy, a Golden Palm Star on the Palm Springs, California, Walk of Stars was dedicated to Venturi.  In 2013, he was inducted into the World Golf Hall of Fame in the lifetime achievement category.

Death
Venturi died two days after his 82nd birthday, in Rancho Mirage, California, on May 17, 2013. He had been hospitalized for two months for a spinal infection, pneumonia, and an intestinal infection. Venturi is survived by his third wife Kathleen, two sons, Matthew and Tim and four adult grandchildren Peter, Andrew, Sara and Gianna. He was buried at the Forest Lawn Cemetery in Cathedral City, California.

Amateur wins (5)
1950 San Francisco City Amateur Championship
1951 California State Amateur Championship
1953 San Francisco City Amateur Championship
1956 California State Amateur Championship, San Francisco City Amateur Championship

Professional wins (15)

PGA Tour wins (14)

PGA Tour playoff record (0–3)

Other wins (1)
1959 Almaden Open

Major championships

Wins (1)

Results timeline
Amateur

Professional

LA = Low amateur
CUT = missed the half-way cut
WD = withdrew
R64, R32, R16, QF, SF = Round in which player lost in match play
"T" = tied

Sources: Masters, U.S. Open, Open Championship, PGA Championship, 1955 British Amateur

Summary

Most consecutive cuts made – 12 (1959 U.S. Open – 1964 PGA)
Longest streak of top-10s – 2 (four times)

U.S. national team appearances
Amateur
Walker Cup: 1953 (winners)
Americas Cup: 1952 (winners), 1956 (winners)

Professional
Ryder Cup: 1965 (winners)
Presidents Cup: 2000 Presidents Cup (winners, non-playing captain)

See also
List of golfers with most PGA Tour wins

References

External links

American male golfers
San Jose State Spartans men's golfers
PGA Tour golfers
Ryder Cup competitors for the United States
Winners of men's major golf championships
World Golf Hall of Fame inductees
Golf writers and broadcasters
Golfers from San Francisco
American people of Italian descent
People from Rancho Mirage, California
Deaths from pneumonia in California
Burials at Forest Lawn Cemetery (Cathedral City)
1931 births
2013 deaths